Septocyta ruborum is a species of fungus in the Ascomycota. Its taxonomic relationship to other taxa in the Ascomycota is unknown, and it has not been assigned with certainty to any order or family (incertae sedis). It is a plant pathogen and grows on Rubus laciniatus, R. nessensis, R. procerus and wild blackberry (R. fruticosus); it causes purple blotch or stem spot disease, also known as dieback of blackberries.

References

External links 
Index Fungorum

Fungal plant pathogens and diseases
Small fruit diseases
Ascomycota enigmatic taxa
Fungi described in 1834